The 2004 Craven District Council election took place on 10 June 2004 to elect members of Craven District Council in North Yorkshire, England. One third of the council was up for election and the council stayed under no overall control.

After the election, the composition of the council was as follows:
Conservative 13
Independent 11
Liberal Democrats 6

Background
After the last election in 2003, the Conservatives had 11 seats, compared to 10 for independents and 9 Liberal Democrats. However, in November 2003 an independent candidate gained a seat from the Liberal Democrats at a by-election in Bentham.

At the 2004 election two long serving councillors stood down, Beth Graham from Settle and Ribblesbanks ward, who had been a councillor since 1976, and Peter Walbank of Grassington ward. Candidates at the election included the first Labour Party candidate for a few years, James Black in Skipton South, while the Green Party also stood a candidate in Aire Valley with Lothersdale.

Election result
The Conservatives gained 2 seats at the election to have 13 councillors, compared to 11 independents and 6 Liberal Democrats. Overall turnout at the election reached 50% after being held with all postal voting, only 9% below the turnout nationally at the 2001 general election, with the high turnout leading to a delay in the counting of the results.

Ward results

By-elections between 2004 and 2006

References

2004
2004 English local elections
2000s in North Yorkshire